Szombierki Coal Mine is a former coal mine in Szombierki, Bytom, Poland. It was created in 1870 from several smaller coal fields. From mid-1990s it begun to be retired.

In 2004 its winding tower "Krystyna" (formerly Kaiser Wilhelm) was added to the Polish register of monuments.

During a 2009 vote the tower was voted as one of the "Seven Architectural Wonders of the Silesian Voivodeship."

References

Buildings and structures in Bytom
Szombierki
Coal mines in Silesian Voivodeship
1870 establishments in Prussia
Tourist attractions in Silesian Voivodeship